Dudda may refer to:

 Dudda, Hassan, Karnataka, India
 Julian Dudda (born 1993), German football player

See also
 Duda (disambiguation)